Margarites imperialis is a species of sea snail, a marine gastropod mollusk in the family Margaritidae.

Description
The height of the shell attains 9.6 mm, its diameter 8.8 mm.

Distribution
This species occurs in the Atlantic Ocean off Brazil at depths between 640 m and 900 m.

References

 Simone L.R.L. & Birman A. 2006. Two new species of the genus Margarites (Vetigastropoda: Trochidae) from Brazil. Novapex 7(1): 13–16
 Bouchet, P.; Fontaine, B. (2009). List of new marine species described between 2002–2006. Census of Marine Life.

imperialis
Gastropods described in 2006